Hussain Jiffry is a Sri Lankan born American bassist who performed on Herb Alpert’s album ‘’Steppin’ Out’’, which won Best Pop Instrumental Album Award at the 56th Grammy Awards in 2014.
Education-Wesley college colombo

References

Sri Lankan emigrants to the United States
Sri Lankan musicians
Living people
Year of birth missing (living people)